El Carmen is a Chilean commune and town in Diguillín Province, Ñuble Region.

Demographics
Of these, 4,426 (34.5%) lived in urban areas and 8,419 (65.5%) in rural areas. The population fell by 9.3% (1316 persons) between the 1992 and 2002 censuses.

Administration
As a commune, El Carmen is a third-level administrative division of Chile administered by a municipal council, headed by an alcalde who is directly elected every four years. The 2008-2012 alcalde is Juan Diaz González (Ind.).

Within the electoral divisions of Chile, El Carmen is represented in the Chamber of Deputies by Carlos Abel Jarpa  (PRSD) and Rosauro Martínez (RN) as part of the 41st electoral district, together with Chillán, Coihueco, Pinto, San Ignacio, Pemuco, Yungay and Chillán Viejo. The commune is represented in the Senate by Victor Pérez Varela (UDI) and Mariano Ruiz-Esquide Jara (PDC) as part of the 13th senatorial constituency (Biobío-Coast).

References

External links
  Municipality of El Carmen

Communes of Chile
Populated places in Diguillín Province